Brodiaea santarosae is a rare Brodiaea species known by the common name Santa Rosa brodiaea and Santa Rosa Basalt brodiaea. It is endemic to southern California, mostly in the region around the junction of Orange, Riverside, and San Diego Counties and limited to ancient basaltic soils. There are only five known populations. It was once thought to be an intergrade of Brodiaea filifolia and B. orcuttii, but measurements found this to be false. It was described as a new species in 2007.

It is on the California Native Plant Society's list of rare and  endangered species.

Description
It is a perennial producing an inflorescence  bearing bright purple flowers. Each flower has six spreading tepals with a center containing three stamens and narrow or small staminodes, which are flat sterile stamens lying against the tepals.

References

External links
Salmon, R. Volunteers find new flower species at reserve. Press Enterprise November 19, 2007.
Jepson Manual Treatment
Photo gallery

santarosae
Endemic flora of California
Natural history of the California chaparral and woodlands
Natural history of the Peninsular Ranges
Flora of Riverside County, California
Natural history of Orange County, California
Natural history of San Diego County, California
Plants described in 2007
Critically endangered flora of California